A list of films produced in Russia in 2015 (see 2015 in film).

Highest-grossing films

Film releases

See also

2015 in film
2015 in Russia

References

External links

2015
Films
Russia